State tax levels indicate both the tax burden and the services a state can afford to provide residents.

States use a different combination of sales, income, excise taxes, and user fees. Some are levied directly from residents and others are levied indirectly. This table includes the per capita tax collected at the state level.

This table does not necessarily reflect the actual tax burdens borne directly by individual persons or businesses in a state. For example, the direct state tax burden on individuals in Alaska is far lower than the table would indicate. The state has no direct personal income tax and does not collect a sales tax at the state level, although it allows local governments to collect their own sales taxes. Alaska collects most of its revenue from corporate taxes on the oil and gas industry.

This table does not take into consideration the taxing and spending of local governments within states, which can vary widely, and sometimes disproportionately with state tax burdens.

State government tax collections (2015) 

This data is collected by the United States Census Bureau for state governments during fiscal year 2015.  These statistics include tax collections for state governments only; they do not include tax collections from local governments. % represents the proportion of total taxes from that category and not the tax rate.

Notes 

 Includes alcohol, fuel, and tobacco taxes
 Includes both personal and business income
 Only includes taxes collected at the state level
 Includes inheritance, gift, and severance taxes
 As of July 1, 2015

State government tax collections (2012) 

This data is collected by the United States Census Bureau for state governments during fiscal year 2012.  These statistics include tax collections for state governments only; they do not include tax collections from local governments. % represents the proportion of total taxes from that category and not the tax rate.

Notes 

 Includes alcohol, fuel, and tobacco taxes
 Includes both personal and business income
 Only includes taxes collected at the state level
 Includes inheritance, gift, and severance taxes
 As of July 1, 2012

State individual income tax rates and brackets

See also
State taxes:
Sales taxes in the United States
State income tax

Federal:
Income tax in the United States
Federal tax revenue by state
Federal spending and taxation across states

General:
Taxation in the United States

References

External links
State Tax Revenue by Tax Type: 1994 - 2010
Local taxes per capita

State taxation in the United States
Tax incidence